Tendai Ryan Nguni (born 17 January 1985),  is a Zimbabwean hip hop rapper, singer, songwriter, and actor from Harare, Zimbabwe who performs using the stage name Tehn Diamond or Tehn. He is a member of the hip-hop collective Few Kings, with whom he has released one album. On the First of January 2017, Tehn released his debut album titled a few good poems and later that year they released the sequel to The Feeling Aint Fair titled The Feeling Aint Fear or just #TFAF2 with Jnr Brown & Take Fizzo. He stars in the movie Cook Off, Zimbabwe's first feature film to be released via Netflix.

Early life

Tendai Nguni was born in 1985 to a politician father, Sylvester Nguni and his mother, a care giver. He has one brother and two sisters. While raised in the Borrowdale Brooke section, a gated community in Harare, Zimbabwe, and attended the St George's College, he originally moved to Brisbane, Australia to pursue a degree in finance, but later dropped out to pursue a music career. In 2008, Federal Government of Australia announced it would revoke student visas for eight children of senior members of President Robert Mugabe's regime and Tendai Nguni was one of them.

Musical career

Early years
He relocated to Singapore where he began to explore his music talent. Whilst in Singapore, Tehn Diamond performed over 800 shows, before moving back to Zimbabwe where he now resides permanently.

Tehn Diamond's career started with Student of the Game — Higher Learning, in 2008 and its follow-up titled Student of the Game — Boys will be Boys in 2010. They received a good following landing him a National Arts Merits Award accolade for Best Video in 2012.

2012-present
In December 2014, he embarked on a tour of Zimbabwe which saw him perform at multiple venues across Zimbabwe culminating in a show in   Bulawayo hosted by local beauty products brand VAULTED and has done several collaborations with other fellow Zimbabwean artists including The Djembe Monks, tribal house music group from Bulawayo. Tehn Diamond also headlined Africa's biggest reality eviction show Big Brother.  His song titled Happy was placed in rotation nationally by all major radio stations that include Star FM and Power FM and was nominated for best song of the year at the Zim Hip Hop Awards On Valentine's Day 2015 he opened for Cassper Nyovest at 1+1 Long Cheng Plaza in Harare, of which Twitter went crazy over his performance with the main artist Cassper Nyovest himself tweeting "...you dope!"

Awards

National Arts Merit Awards
The awards which are commonly referred to as the NAMAs are the principal awards in Zimbabwe and Tehn Diamond has won a NAMA more than once particularly in 2012 for Best Video(Happy ft Jnr Brown)

|-
| rowspan=2| 2012 || rowspan=2| "Student Of the Game(SOTG)-Boys Will Be Boys"
|-
| Best Video || 
|-
| rowspan=2| 2010 || rowspan=2| "Student Of The Game-Higher Learning"|| Best Hip Hop Artist || 
|-
| Best Hip Hop Album ||

Discography

Compilation albums

As lead artist

References

1985 births
Living people
Zimbabwean rappers
Zimbabwean record producers
Alumni of St. George's College, Harare